Named after the fruit, the color tangerine is a tone of orange.

Use in graphic design 
Hues of tangerine are sometimes important to graphic designers when constructing identities, brand recognition, and stand-out ads for clients. Because of the brightness of the color variants, they are often employed to make a small but centrally important object stand out, especially when surrounded by the flat colors of earth tones. Tangerine hues may also be selected as complements to other bright hues, and because of their relative rarity of use.

One of the original "fruit-flavored" iMacs released in 1999 was the Tangerine iMac (Apple could not call it "Orange" due to the existence of the rival firm Orange Micro).

See also 
 List of colors

References

External links 
 Color chart

Shades of orange